Lee Jung-myung is a South Korean writer. A popular writer of historical fiction, his books have sold millions of copies in his native country. Several of his books have been adapted into successful TV miniseries, e.g. The Deep-Rooted Tree (2006) and The Painter of Wind (2007). Other books include The Gospel of the Murderer, The Boy Who Escaped Paradise and The Investigation. The last-mentioned novel was translated by Chi Young Kim and was nominated for the Independent Foreign Fiction Prize. The book was inspired by the real-life experiences of Korean poet and dissident Yun Dong-ju.
His book La guardia, il poeta e l'investigatore has been selected among the final six books for Premio Bancarella in 2017.

See also
Portrait of a Beauty

References

Living people
South Korean writers
South Korean crime fiction writers
Year of birth missing (living people)